This is a comprehensive list of major music awards received by CeCe Winans, an American Gospel singer.

Awards

References

Winans, Cece